Le 1501 McGill College, also known as La Tour McGill, is a , 36-storey skyscraper in Downtown Montreal. Named for its address at 1501 McGill College Avenue, it was completed in 1992 at the same time as the city's two tallest buildings, 1000 de La Gauchetière and 1250 René-Lévesque. It is connected to the McGill Metro station via the Underground City.

Architecture

Designed by WZMH Architects, the building's postmodern form features a glass curtain wall that varies between blue and green depending on sunlight. The top 4 floors form a pyramid-shaped mechanical penthouse that is lit white at night. At certain times of year, it is lit with a colour (or colours) relating to a holiday or event. For example, it is lit white, green and red during the Christmas holidays (in a similar manner to the Empire State Building), purple and yellow for Easter, orange for Halloween, green for Saint Patrick's Day, red for Valentine's Day, and, as of April 2011, blue, white and red to support the Montreal Canadiens during the Stanley Cup playoffs.

Tenants
Bank of Canada
BMO Capital Markets
BMO Nesbitt Burns
Chappuis Halder & Co
Davies Ward Phillips & Vineberg
DLA Piper
Newedge Group
RBC Dominion Securities
Société Générale
Consulate-General of France in Montréal

See also
 List of tallest buildings in Montreal

References

External links
 Polaris Realty | Properties > 1501 McGill College Avenue

Skyscrapers in Montreal
Office buildings completed in 1992
Postmodern architecture in Canada
Skyscraper office buildings in Canada
Downtown Montreal
WZMH Architects buildings